is a Japanese manga series written and illustrated by Tsukasa Hojo. The story follows the adventures of the three Kisugi sisters, Hitomi, Rui and Ai, who are art thieves trying to collect all the works belonging to their missing father. It was serialized in Weekly Shōnen Jump from 1981 to 1985, and collected into 18 tankōbon by Shueisha. The series has been reprinted in several editions.

Jump Comics

Aizouban

Bunkoban

Complete

References

Cat's Eye
chapters